Kupferbach may refer to:

 Kupferbach (Berka), a river of Hesse, Germany
 Kupferbach (Tannbach), a river of Thuringia and Bavaria, Germany